Blind Arvella Gray (January 28, 1906 - September 7, 1980) was an American blues, folk and gospel singer and guitarist.

Gray was born James Dixon, in Somerville, Texas. He spent the latter part of his life performing and busking folk, blues and gospel music at Chicago's Maxwell Street flea market and at rapid-transit depots. In the 1960s, he recorded two singles for his own Gray label, including "Freedom Rider" backed with "Freedom Bus."

Gray's only album, The Singing Drifter (1973), was reissued on the Conjuroo record label in 2005. The reissue was produced by Cary Baker, who wrote the liner notes for the original vinyl LP, released by Birch Records.

Gray died in Chicago, Illinois, in September 1980, at the age of 74.

References

External links
 Illustrated Blind Arvella Gray discography

1906 births
1980 deaths
American blues singers
American blues guitarists
American male guitarists
Songwriters from Texas
American street performers
Blind musicians
20th-century American guitarists
Guitarists from Texas
African-American male songwriters
African-American guitarists
20th-century African-American male singers
Burials at Restvale Cemetery